Émile Brami (born 19 April 1950) is a French writer and bookseller of Tunisian origin. He was born in Jendouba, formerly known as Souk El Arba, in Tunisia. He moved to France in 1964 and settled in Paris. He is a specialist on Louis-Ferdinand Celine, the 20th-century writer, and published a biography in 2003. 
 
Brami established and ran a bookshop "D'un livre l'autre" in Paris that deals mainly with Celine. He is of Jewish and Berber origin. His works often refer back to his childhood and his Tunisian Jewish background. In 2001, he won the Prix Bernard Palissy for his first novel Histoire de la Poupee. He also won the Prix Mediterranee for his novel Le Manteau de la vierge in 2007.

Works

Novels
 Histoire de la poupée, Éditions Écriture, 2000 (prix Bernard Palissy du premier roman 2001)
 Art brut, Éditions Écriture, 2001 (Attention talent de la Fnac décembre 2001 et Prix Lucioles des lecteurs 2001)
 Le Manteau de la vierge, Fayard, 2006 (Prix Méditerranée 2007)
 Amis de la poésie, Fayard, 2008
 Émile l'Africain, Fayard, 2008

Others
 Rigor mortis, avec six photographies de Xavier Lambours, Éditions Écriture, 2002
 Céline: je ne suis pas assez méchant pour me donner en exemple, Éditions Écriture, 2003
 Céline, Hergé et l'affaire Haddock, Éditions Écriture, 2004
 Céline vivant (DVD), Éditions montparnasse, 2007
 Le Corps qui souffre, édition privée tirée à 200 exemplaires numérotés et signés par l'auteur

References

1950 births
French people of Berber descent
French people of Tunisian-Jewish descent
Living people
Berber Jews
Tunisian Jews
Tunisian emigrants to France
20th-century French Jews
Jewish French writers
People from Jendouba Governorate
French male writers
Berber writers